Kaysen is a surname of Danish origin. Notable people with the surname include:

Carl Kaysen (1920–2010), American economist and academic
Gavin Kaysen (born 1979), American chef
Susanna Kaysen (born 1948), American writer

References

Surnames of Danish origin